Matías Daniel Soler (born 18 April 1995) is an Argentine professional footballer who plays as a goalkeeper.

Career
Soler started in the youth system of Boca Juniors, prior to joining Huracán's ranks in 2013. He departed in August 2017 to join Plaza Colonia of the Uruguayan Primera División. He made his professional debut on 16 September in a defeat to Rampla Juniors, which was one of seven appearances in a season that ended in relegation to the Uruguayan Segunda División for Plaza Colonia. He subsequently left the club at the end of 2017. Soler signed a contract with Lanús in July 2018, initially joining the reserve team. He remained until February 2020, when he left to return to Uruguayan football with Segunda División team Villa Española.

Soler wouldn't feature for El Villa due to the COVID-19 pandemic, subsequently leaving to head back to Argentina in July. He trialled with Los Andes in December 2020, featuring in a friendly against Sacachispas.

Career statistics
.

References

External links

1995 births
Living people
Sportspeople from Buenos Aires Province
Argentine footballers
Association football goalkeepers
Argentine expatriate footballers
Expatriate footballers in Uruguay
Argentine expatriate sportspeople in Uruguay
Uruguayan Primera División players
Plaza Colonia players
Club Atlético Lanús footballers
Villa Española players